LZFSE (Lempel–Ziv Finite State Entropy) is an open source lossless data compression algorithm created by Apple Inc.  It was released with a simpler algorithm called LZVN.

Overview 
The name is an acronym for Lempel–Ziv and finite-state entropy (implementation of asymmetric numeral systems).
LZFSE was introduced by Apple at its Worldwide Developer Conference 2015. It shipped with that year's iOS 9 and OS X 10.11 releases.

Apple claims that LZFSE compresses with a ratio comparable to that of zlib (DEFLATE) and decompresses two to three times faster while using fewer resources, therefore offering higher energy efficiency than zlib. It was aimed for scenarios where decompression speed and rate should be prioritised equally. Part of this energy efficiency was achieved by optimising the algorithm for modern micro-architectures, specifically focusing on arm64. Third-party benchmarking confirms that LZFSE decompresses faster than zlib, but also suggests that many other modern compression algorithms may have more favorable compression algorithm performance characteristics such as density, compression speed and decompression speed by a significant margin.

According to the Squash Benchmark, LZFSE is similar in speed to ZSTD (level 6), but has a slightly worse ratio. LZVN is similar in speed to LZ4 level 4, with a slightly worse ratio as well. Neither LZFSE nor LZVN is tunable at runtime, although a few constants can be tweaked at compile time for the usual speed-ratio trade-off.

Implementation 
A reference C library written by Eric Bainville was made available under the 3-clause BSD License after WWDC 2016. It includes an executable to compress and decompress LZFSE streams as well. There are no plans to expose an LZVN API.

This is a LZSS-type algorithm without entropy encoding but with three widths of REP (L,M,D) packets. In the open source reference implementation, Apple explains that LZFSE does not perform as well for small sizes, so LZVN is used instead. This algorithm in libfastCompression.a was discovered earlier as the default kernelcache compression method in Mac OS X Yosemite Developer Preview 1 (2014), replacing the legacy  compression from Haruhiko Okumura.

Usage 
AppleFSCompression.framework (AFSC), the mechanism for quasi-transparent compression in HFS Plus and Apple File System, supports LZFSE and LZVN since OS X 10.9.

Apple's Disk Images framework has offered an LZFSE-based encoding called  since Mac OS X 10.11, accessible via  and some third-party image utilities.

See also 
 Zstandard – another combination of LZ77 and FSE, by Yann Collet, the FSE author 
 LZ4 compression algorithm – a fast member of the LZ77 family, also available on Apple platforms

References

External links 
 
 Finite State Entropy by Yann Collet (Cyan4973), the source of the FSE implementation in LZFSE
 Discussion on Encode.su, from which the maintainer Eric Bainville has taken suggestions

Lossless compression algorithms
Free computer libraries